Alessandro Rossi (1589–1656) was a Roman Catholic prelate who served as the Bishop of Ariano (1650–1656).

Biography
Alessandro Rossi was born in Naples, Italy in 1589.
On 14 February 1650, he was appointed during the papacy of Pope Innocent X as Bishop of Ariano.
On 24 February 1650, he was consecrated bishop by Francesco Maria Brancaccio, Bishop of Viterbo e Tuscania. 
He served as Bishop of Ariano until his death in August 1656.

References

External links and additional sources
 (for Chronology of Bishops) 
 (for Chronology of Bishops) 

17th-century Italian Roman Catholic bishops
Bishops appointed by Pope Innocent X
Bishops of Ariano
1589 births
1656 deaths